Hound's Tooth is a peak in the Purcell Mountains of the Columbia Mountains in southeastern British Columbia, Canada. 
Hound's Tooth is a rock pinnacle at the end of Marmolata Mountain's northeast ridge. Both mountains are Nunataks, sticking up from the middle of the Bugaboo Glacier. The Hounds' Tooth is composed of a coarse, fractured granite.

Climate
Based on the Köppen climate classification, Hound's Tooth is located in a subarctic climate zone with cold, snowy winters, and mild summers. Winter temperatures can drop below −20 °C with wind chill factors below −30 °C.

See also
 The Bugaboos

References

Two-thousanders of British Columbia
Columbia Valley
Purcell Mountains